The Gold Medal for Italian Architecture, is a triennial Italian architecture prize. It has been awarded since 2003 by the Triennale di Milano in collaboration with the Ministero dei beni e delle attività culturali e del turismo (the Italian ministry of culture), and with MADE expo, a trade fair for the construction industry. 

Recipients of the medal have been: Umberto Riva and PierPaolo Ricatti in 2003; the Renzo Piano Building Workshop in 2006; Doriana and Massimiliano Fuksas in 2009; Vincenzo Latina in 2012; and Massimo Carmassi and Università Iuav di Venezia in 2015.

References

Further reading 
Luca Molinari, Medaglia d'oro all'architettura italiana = Gold medal for Italian architecture, Triennale di Milano 2003
Fulvio Irace, Medaglia d'oro all'architettura italiana = Gold medal for italian architecture: 2006, Mondadori Electa, 2006
Fulvio Irace, Medaglia d'oro all'architettura italiana = Gold medal for italian architecture : 2009 , HOEPLI, 2009()
Ennio Brion, Medaglia d'oro all'architettura italiana 2012, IV edizione, Editrice Compositori, 2012
Fondazione La Triennale di Milano], Medaglia d'Oro all'Architettura Italiana 2015 = Gold Medal for Italian Architecture 2015, Mandragora, 2015

Awards established in 2003
Architecture awards
Italian awards